Peter Cook (born 1 November 1932) is a former Australian rules footballer who played with Melbourne in the Victorian Football League (VFL). Known by the name Peter, his real first name was David.

Notes

External links 

1932 births
Australian rules footballers from Victoria (Australia)
Melbourne Football Club players
Living people